El Borge is a town and municipality in the province of Málaga, part of the autonomous community of Andalusia in southern Spain. It is located in the comarca of Axarquía. The municipality is situated approximately 24 kilometers from Vélez-Málaga, 28 from the provincial capital of Málaga and 567 km from Madrid. It has a population of approximately 1,000 residents. The natives are called Borgeños.

The town of El Borge is situated at the foot of the Cerro de Cútar mountain, on the border of the Axarquia and Montes de Malaga comarcas, and is known as the "raisin capital" because the town is one of the largest producers of Muscatel raisins. These products have their own DO (denominacion de origin), like wine. It's no surprise, then, that El Borge is one of the towns of the Ruta de la Pasa (The Raisin Route), and or that in its surroundings you can see many paseros (areas where grapes dried by the sun and converted into delicious raisins).

El Borge has some degree of notoriety as the birthplace of one of the most famous bandits in 19th-century Malaga province. Luis Muñoz Garcia, known as the Bizco de El Borge, was born here. Today, his birthplace has been converted into a rural hotel with a small museum dedicated to banditry.
Regarding local products, besides the tasty and famous local Muscat raisins and wine, you can find ajoblanco (chilled almond soup), gazpacho (chilled tomato soup) with lima beans or cucumber, tortillas de bacalao con miel de caña (cod tortillas with honey) and hornazo del día de San Marcos (a bread-like desert with a boiled egg in the middle), amongst other culinary specialities.
The best day to enjoy the Muscatel dishes is on the Dia de la Pasa (Raisin Day) - a popular fiesta, held on the third Sunday of September, which thousands of visitors come to. Other days highlighted in the town's celebration calendar are the Fiestas Patronales en honor de San Gabriel Arcángel (celebrations in honour of the Archangel St Gabriel) that take place at the end of Semana Santa, the Día de San Marcos on 25 April, the Romería de San Isidro on 15 May, and at the end of June the Noche de las Candelas.

References

Municipalities in the Province of Málaga